

Sovereign states

A
 Aceh – 
 Ahom – 
 Ajuran – 
 Alirajpur – 
 Alwar – 
 Angoche – 
 Anhalt-Bernburg – 
 Anhalt-Dessau – 
 Anhalt-Köthen – 
 Aragon – 
 Athgarh – 
 Austria – 
 Ayutthaya –

B
 Baguirmi – 
 Bali – 
 Banten – 
 Baol – 
 Bavaria – 
 Benin – 
 Bohemia – 
 Bornu –

C
 Cambodia
 Cayor – 
 Champa – 
 Cochin – 
 Cospaia – 
 Croatia (Habsburg) –

D
 Dahomey – 
 Denanke – 
 Denmark–Norway
 Dendi –

E
 England – 
 Ethiopia –

F
 Frankfurt – 
 –

G
 Galicia – 
Garo – 
 Garwhal – 
 Genoa – 
Gyaaman

H
 Habsburg – 
 Holstein – 
 Hohenzollern-Hechingen – 
 Hohenzollern-Sigmaringen – 
 Holstein – 
 Hungary –

I
 Imereti – 
 Ireland –

J
 Jaisalmer – 
Janjero – 
 Johor-Riau – 
Jolof – 
 Joseon –

K
Kaabu – 
Kaffa – 
 Kakheti – 
 Kalahandi – 
 Kandy – 
 Kartli – 
 Kasanje –  
 Kasanze – 
 Kazakh Khanate
 Kongo – 
 Koya –

L
 Lippe – 
 Loango – 
 Luba – 
 Lübeck – 
 Lucca –

M
 Maguindanao – 
 Maldives – 
Mandara – 
 Manipur – 
Mankessim – 
Matamba – 
 Mecklenburg-Schwerin – 
Medri Bahri
 Merina – 
 Moldavia – 
 Modena – 
 Morocco – 
Mughal Empire
 Mutapa – 
 Mysore –

N
 Naples – 
 Navarre – 
 New Granada – 
Nri –

O
 Ottoman Empire
Oualo –

P
 Parma – 
 Pattani – 
Portugal – 
Prussia –

R
 Ragusa – 
 Reuss-Lobenstein – 
 Ryukyu –

S
 Safavid – 
Saloum – 
 Sardinia – 
 Saxe-Lauenburg – 
 Scotland – 
 Schleswig – 
Sennar – 
 Sicily – 
Sine – 
 Sirmoor – 
 Soran – 
 Sulu – 
Chutiya – 
Sweden

T
 Toledo – 
 Tuscany – 
Tripura –

V
 Valencia –

W
Waldeck – 
 Wallachia – 
Warsangli – 
 Württemberg –

Non-sovereign territories

England
 English America

References

1620